The Arapaoa River is a northeastern arm of the Kaipara Harbour in Northland, New Zealand.

See also
List of rivers of New Zealand

References
Land Information New Zealand - Search for Place Names

Kaipara District
Rivers of the Northland Region
Rivers of New Zealand
Kaipara Harbour catchment